Kelly Cristina dos Santos, better known as Cris Vianna (born April 11, 1977) is a Brazilian actress, model, and former singer.

Biography
Vianna was born in São Paulo. At the age of 13, her father, a sportsman, died. She was forced to pay for her studies the following year, as her mother, a nursing assistant, had to take care of the house and two other children. Vianna began taking care of two children, aged 5 and 7 years old, who were the daughters of a neighbor. She began her modelling career as a teenager, after knocking on the door of several agencies until she managed to schedule fashion shows and TV commercials. Vianna walked the runways in Italy, Canada, Australia and Germany.

Vianna made her television debut on América in 2005, portraying Drica. The following year, she had a role in Sinhá Moça as well as in O Profeta. Vianna sang for three years in the vocal group Black Voices.

In 2010, Vianna received the Raça Negra trophy, in the Best Cinema Actress category, for her role in The Assailant. She was the drum queen of Grande Rio at the Carnival in 2011. Vianna joined the cast of the soap opera Fina Estampa in 2011, playing Dagmar dos Anjos. She said that she identified with her character's sensual side. In 2014, Vianna played Juju Popular on the soap opera Império. The role was originally intended for Viviane Araújo.

On December 1, 2015, Vianna was a victim of racism on social media, alongside the journalist Maria Júlia Coutinho and the actress Taís Araújo.

Filmography

Television

Films

Internet

References

External links
Cris Vianna at the Internet Movie Database

1977 births
Living people
Brazilian television actresses
Afro-Brazilian actresses
Actresses from São Paulo